Walnut Corner is an unincorporated community in Greene County, Arkansas, United States, located on Arkansas Highway 228,  northeast of Sedgwick.

References

Unincorporated communities in Greene County, Arkansas
Unincorporated communities in Arkansas